The Chief Scientist of the Air Force is the most senior science & technology representative in the United States Department of the Air Force. The current Chief Scientist of the United States Air Force is Victoria Coleman, sworn in on April 6, 2021.

Roles and responsibilities
The Chief Scientist of the Air Force has several roles and responsibilities, including:

 Serves as chief science and technology adviser to the Chief of Staff of the Air Force, the Chief of Space Operations, and the Secretary of the Air Force
 Provides assessments on a wide range of scientific and technical issues affecting the Air Force mission
 Identifies and analyzes technical issues and brings them to the attention of Air Force leaders, and interacts with other Air Staff principals, operational commanders, combatant commands, acquisition, and science and technology communities to address cross-organizational technical issues and solutions
 Interacts with other services and the Office of the Secretary of Defense on issues affecting the Air Force in-house technical enterprise
 Serves on the Steering Committee and Senior Review Group of the Air Force Scientific Advisory Board.
 Principal science and technology representative of the Air Force to the civilian scientific and engineering community and to the public at large

Products of the Office of the Chief Scientist 
The Office of the Chief Scientist has conducted several strategic studies including:

 Technology Horizons
 Energy Horizons
 Cyber Vision 2025, summarized in the Armed Forces Journal
 Global Horizons

Chronological list of Chief Scientists of the Air Force

References

External links
 

 
United States Air Force appointments